Barand may refer to:
 Barand-e Olya
 Barand-e Sofla

See also
 Báránd, Hungary